G.I. Joe: A Real American Hero is a 1989–1992 half-hour American animated television series based on the toyline from Hasbro and the comic book series from Marvel Comics. The series was produced by DIC Enterprises.

Background

The series debuted in 1989, with a five-part mini-series titled Operation: Dragonfire, where we see Cobra Commander being returned to human form. The regular series began in 1990, lasting for two seasons and 44 episodes. The series continued the original G.I. Joe animated series produced by Sunbow Productions and Marvel Productions that ran in syndication from 1985 to 1986.

In order to cut production costs for the original animated series, Hasbro dropped Sunbow and contracted DiC to continue the series. Story editor Buzz Dixon explained in an interview: "Hasbro had been funding G.I. Joe out of their own pocket; they got a ridiculous deal from DiC to take over the series and they pretty much let them."

The DiC series is a continuation of the Sunbow show, though it chose to focus primarily on new characters of the period. Hawk was retained as G.I. Joe commander, and at times shared his duties with Sgt. Slaughter as head of the G.I. Joe team. Captain Grid-Iron was given field commander duties in Season 1, with Duke regaining his old position and appearing more often in Season 2. Storm Shadow was also now a member of G.I. Joe, as action figures of the character had been sold as a Joe rather than a Cobra since 1988, keeping in line with the story of the comics, where he had abandoned Cobra in 1986–87.

The first season centered almost exclusively on the 1990 Joes; meanwhile, Cobra, having a less extensive cast, was augmented by select characters from 1989 and the yet-to-be-released 1991 figures. This new ensemble had a much wider variety of Cobra forces, with viewers being introduced to the Night Creepers and many different forms of Vipers.  One of the more noticeable changes to Cobra is that Destro has returned now wearing a gold mask (instead of silver) and wears a uniform with a shoulder gauntlet.  Arthur Burghardt did not return to reprise the Destro voice role, thus Destro's voice was one of several acted by Maurice LaMarche.

The first season of the DiC series was mainly standalone episodes that focused on establishing new team members and plots. After the "Operation Dragonfire" miniseries, the DiC show lowered the animation budget and began a series of two part episodes, which often told a deeper story involving more dramatic life and death situations for the Joes. The theme song called "Got to get tough... Yo Joe!" and underscore for both seasons were provided by Stephen James Taylor.

Also a casualty of the animation company changeover was the extensive voice cast Sunbow employed, which largely consisted of voice actors employed by West Coast American companies. Because the DiC series was produced in Canada, an almost entirely new cast was assembled. Only a few actors from the Sunbow series returned for the DIC series; Sgt. Slaughter, Chris Latta (the voice of Cobra Commander), Ed Gilbert (General Hawk), Jerry Houser (Sci-Fi) and Morgan Lofting (Baroness). With Season 2, Chris Latta was the only voice actor to return, and the Baroness and Hawk were recast with new voices.

Summary
After the events of G.I. Joe: The Movie, Cobra has fallen into disarray; with Storm Shadow, Zartan, Mindbender, Tomax and Xamot abandoning the group and the remaining subleaders having grown exasperated with the blowhard Serpentor. As a result, Baroness restores Cobra Commander to a humanoid form; deposing Serpentor, Cobra Commander takes the reins once more. With that, Cobra renews its offensive against G.I. Joe, now consisting of a new generation of Joes led by Sgt. Slaughter and Hawk.

Cast
 Mark Acheson – Range Viper 1 (I Found You... Evy)
 Jackson Beck – Narrator ("Operation Dragonfire" mini-series)
 Michael Benyaer – Airwave, Scoop
 Jay Brazeau – Cesspool
 Don Brown – Sub-Zero, Mutt (The Greatest Evil), Crimson Guard Immortal (The Greatest Evil)
 Jim Byrnes – Alley Viper, Rimpoche ("Operation Dragonfire"), Narrator (Seasons 1 and 2 intro sequences)
 Garry Chalk – Pathfinder, Shockwave, Gristle, Metal-Head, BIOK
 Brent Chapman – Red Star, Salvo
 Babz Chula – Metal-Head's Granny
 Christopher Collins – Cobra Commander
 Lisa Corps – Lady Jaye (Operation Dragonfire), Zarana, Range Viper 3/Evy
 Kevin Conway – Rock 'n Roll, Dusty, José Riviera
 Ian James Corlett – Rampart, Gnawgahyde, Billy Blaster
 Michael Donovan – Big Bear
 Suzanne Errett-Balcom – Lady Jaye (Season 1), Scarlett
 Ed Gilbert – General Hawk (Season 1)
 Marcy Goldberg – Baroness (Season 2)
 Ted Harrison – Duke
 Phil Hayes – Airborne, Tracker, Cloudburst
 Fred Henderson – Ozone
 Jerry Houser – Sci-Fi
 Lee Jeffrey – Stalker
 David Kaye – General Hawk (Season 2)
 Annabel Kershaw – Fiona Diamond
 Terry Klassen – Topside
 Josh Andrew Koenig – Ambush (Season 1), Night Creeper Leader (Season 1)
 Maurice LaMarche – Big Ben, Flint, Low-Light, Mercer, Psyche-Out, Spirit, Copperhead, Destro, Skydive, Serpentor, Wet-Suit, Night Creeper Leader (Season 2)
 Morgan Lofting – Baroness ("Operation Dragonfire" and Season 1) 
 Blu Mankuma – Roadblock, Guardian of El Dorado (in "El Dorado: The Lost City of Gold")
 Scott McNeil – Freefall, Skymate, Storm Shadow, Dice, Headman, Lt. Falcon, Slice
 Shane Meier – Jesse (Cobra World)
 Pauline Newstone – President Mason (Injustice and the Cobra Way), Zarana (Injustice and the Cobra Way)
 John Novak – Range-Viper (Pigskin Commandos)
 Doug Parker – Dragon Emperor (Night of the Creepers)
 Margot Pinvidic – Dr. Suzanne Winters (Metal-Head's Reunion)
 Rick Poltaruk – Laser-Viper (Injustice and the Cobra Way)
 Bob Remus – Sgt. Slaughter
 Alvin Sanders – Stretcher, Bullet-Proof, Static-Line
 Robert O. Smith – Grunt
 William Taylor – Heavy Duty
 David J. Wills – Bullhorn
 Dale Wilson – Capt. Grid-Iron, Mutt (Operation Dragonfire), Overkill, Drop Zone
 Tomm Wright – Sandstorm

Crew
 Madeline Bascomb – Voice Director (Season Two)
 Marsha Goodman – Voice Director ("Operation Dragonfire" mini-series), Casting Director (Season One and Two)
 Shirley McGregor – Talent Coordinator
 Ginny McSwain – Voice Director ("Operation Dragonfire" mini-series)
 Doug Parker – Voice Director ("Operation Dragonfire" mini-series and Season One)
 Paul Quinn – Voice Director (Season Two)
 Victor Villegas – Voice Director ("Operation Dragonfire" mini-series)

Home media

VHS
Select episodes of the series were released on VHS. The first tape, "Revenge of the Pharaoh", was released in 1990 by Hasbro packaged with an action figure of G.I. Joe member Rapid-Fire, who was named after DiC executive Robby London. Buena Vista Home Video later distributed a series of three VHS tapes in 1992, each containing a single episode.

 Revenge of the Pharaoh (packaged with "Rapid-Fire" action figure)
 El Dorado: Lost City of Gold
 Chunnel
 Infested Island

DVD
After releasing the entire Sunbow series on DVD, Shout! Factory and Vivendi Entertainment subsequently released the entire DiC series. G.I. Joe: A Real American Hero Series 2, Season 1 was released on January 10, 2012, and Season 2 was released on July 10, 2012.

See also
 G.I. Joe
 G.I. Joe: A Real American Hero
 G.I. Joe: A Real American Hero (1983 TV series)
 G.I. Joe (comics)
 G.I. Joe Extreme
 G.I. Joe: Renegades
 G.I. Joe: Sigma 6
 G.I. Joe: The Movie

References

External links
 
 G.I. Joe (DIC) at YOJOE.com
 G.I. Joe (DiC's Version) at Retrojunk.com
 

1980s American animated television series
1989 American television series debuts
1990s American animated television series
1992 American television series endings
American children's animated action television series
American children's animated adventure television series
English-language television shows
First-run syndicated television programs in the United States
G.I. Joe television series
Television series by Claster Television
Television series by DIC Entertainment
USA Action Extreme Team